Climate change in Australia has been a critical issue since the beginning of the 21st century. Australia is becoming hotter and more prone to extreme heat, bushfires, droughts, floods, and longer fire seasons because of climate change. Climate issues include wildfires, heatwaves, cyclones, rising sea-levels, and erosion.  

Since the beginning of the 20th century, Australia has experienced an increase of over 1.4 °C in average annual temperatures, with warming occurring at twice the rate over the past 50 years as in the previous 50 years. Recent climate events such as extremely high temperatures and widespread drought have focused government and public attention on the effects of climate change in Australia. Rainfall in southwestern Australia has decreased by 10–20% since the 1970s, while southeastern Australia has also experienced a moderate decline since the 1990s. Rainfall is expected to become heavier and more infrequent, as well as more common in summer rather than in winter. Australia's annual average temperatures are projected to increase 0.4–2.0 °C above 1990 levels by the year 2030, and 1–6 °C by 2070. Average precipitation in the southwest and southeast Australia is projected to decline during this time, while regions such as the northwest may experience increases in rainfall.

Climate change is affecting the continent's environment and ecosystems. Australia is vulnerable to the effects of global warming projected for the next 50 to 100 years because of its extensive arid and semi-arid areas, and already warm climate, high annual rainfall variability. The continent's high fire risk increases this susceptibility to changes in temperature and climate. Meanwhile, Australia's coastlines will experience erosion and inundation from an estimated 8–88 cm increase in global sea level. Australia's unique ecosystems such as the Great Barrier Reef and many animal species are also at risk.  

Climate change also has diverse implications for Australia's economy, agriculture and public health. Projected impacts include more severe floods, droughts, and cyclones. Furthermore, Australia's population is highly concentrated in coastal areas at risk from rising sea levels, and existing pressures on water supply will be exacerbated. The exposure of Indigenous Australians to climate change impacts is exacerbated by existing socio-economic disadvantages which are linked to colonial and post-colonial marginalisation. The communities most affected by climate changes are those in the North where Aboriginal and Torres Strait Islander people make up 30% of the population. Aboriginal and Torres Strait Islander communities located in the coastal north are the most disadvantaged due to social and economic issues and their reliance on traditional land for food, culture, and health. This has raised the question for many community members in these areas, "Should we stay or move away?"

Australia is also a contributor to climate change, with its greenhouse gas emissions per capita above the world average. The country is highly reliant on coal and other fossil fuels, although renewable energy coverage is increasing. National mitigation efforts include a commitment to achieving net zero emissions by 2050 under the Paris Agreement, although Australia has repeatedly ranked poorly in the Climate Change Performance Index and other international rankings for its climate targets and implementation. Adaptation can be performed at national and local levels and was identified as a priority for Australia in the 2007 Garnaut Review.

Climate change has been a divisive or politicised issue in Australian politics since the 2000s, which has contributed to successive governments implementing and repealing climate change policies, such as carbon pricing. Some Australian media outlets have promoted climate misinformation. The issue has sparked protests in support of climate change policies, including some of the largest demonstrations in Australia's history.

Greenhouse gas emissions

Impacts on the natural environment

Temperature and weather changes 
Australia's instrumental record from 1885 to the present shows the following broad picture:

Conditions from 1885 to 1898 were generally fairly wet, though less so than in the period since 1968. The only noticeably dry years in this era were 1888 and 1897. Although some coral core data suggest that 1887 and 1890 were, with 1974, the wettest years across the continent since settlement, rainfall data for Alice Springs, then the only major station covering the interior of the Northern Territory and Western Australia, strongly suggest that 1887 and 1890 were overall not as wet as 1974 or even 2000. In New South Wales and Queensland, however, the years 1886–1887 and 1889–1894 were indeed exceptionally wet. The heavy rainfall over this period has been linked with a major expansion of the sheep population and February 1893 saw the disastrous 1893 Brisbane flood.

A drying of the climate took place from 1899 to 1921, though with some interruptions from wet El Niño years, especially between 1915 and early 1918 and in 1920–1921, when the wheat belt of the southern interior was drenched by its heaviest winter rains on record. Two major El Niño events in 1902 and 1905 produced the two driest years across the whole continent, whilst 1919 was similarly dry in the eastern States apart from the Gippsland.

The period from 1922 to 1938 was exceptionally dry, with only 1930 having Australia-wide rainfall above the long-term mean and the Australia-wide average rainfall for these seventeen years being 15 to 20 per cent below that for other periods since 1885. This dry period is attributed in some sources to a weakening of the Southern Oscillation and in others to reduced sea surface temperatures. Temperatures in these three periods were generally cooler than they are currently, with 1925 having the coolest minima of any year since 1910. However, the dry years of the 1920s and 1930s were also often quite warm, with 1928 and 1938 having particularly high maxima.

The period from 1939 to 1967 began with an increase in rainfall: 1939, 1941 and 1942 were the first close-together group of relatively wet years since 1921. From 1943 to 1946, generally dry conditions returned, and the two decades from 1947 saw fluctuating rainfall. 1950, 1955 and 1956 were exceptionally wet except 1950 and 1956 over arid and wheatbelt regions of Western Australia. 1950 saw extraordinary rains in central New South Wales and most of Queensland: Dubbo's 1950 rainfall of  can be estimated to have a return period of between 350 and 400 years, whilst Lake Eyre filled for the first time in thirty years. In contrast, 1951, 1961 and 1965 were very dry, with complete monsoon failure in 1951/1952 and extreme drought in the interior during 1961 and 1965. Temperatures over this period initially fell to their lowest levels of the 20th century, with 1949 and 1956 being particularly cool, but then began a rising trend that has continued with few interruptions to the present.

Since 1968, Australia's rainfall has been 15 per cent higher than between 1885 and 1967. The wettest periods have been from 1973 to 1975 and 1998 to 2001, which comprise seven of the thirteen wettest years over the continent since 1885. Overnight minimum temperatures, especially in winter, have been markedly higher than before the 1960s, with 1973, 1980, 1988, 1991, 1998 and 2005 outstanding in this respect. There has been a marked decrease in the frequency of frost across Australia.

According to the Bureau of Meteorology, Australia's annual mean temperature for 2009 was 0.9 °C above the 1961–90 average, making it the nation's second-warmest year since high-quality records began in 1910.

Furthermore, 2014 was Australia's third warmest year since national temperature observations commenced in 1910.

Sea level rise 

The Australian Government released a report saying that up to 247,600 houses are at risk from flooding from a sea level rise of 1.1 metres. There were 39,000 buildings located within 110 metres of 'soft' erodible shorelines, at risk from a faster erosion due to sea level rise. Adaptive responses to this specific climate change threat are often incorporated in the coastal planning policies and recommendations at the state level. For instance, the Western Australia State Coastal Planning Policy established a sea level rise benchmark for initiatives that address the problem over a 100-year period.

Water (droughts and floods) 

Bureau of Meteorology records since the 1860s show that a 'severe' drought has occurred in Australia, on average, once every 18 years. Australia is already the driest populated continent in the world.

Rainfall in southwestern Australia has decreased by 10–20% since the 1970s, while southeastern Australia has also experienced a moderate decline since the 1990s. Rainfall is expected to become heavier and more infrequent, as well as more common in summer rather than in winter.

In June 2008 it became known that an expert panel had warned of long-term, maybe irreversible, severe ecological damage for the whole Murray-Darling basin if it did not receive sufficient water by October of that year. Water restrictions were in place in many regions and cities of Australia in response to chronic shortages resulting from the 2008 drought. In 2004 paleontologist Tim Flannery predicted that unless it made drastic changes the city of Perth, Western Australia, could become the world's first ghost metropolis—an abandoned city with no more water to sustain its population.

In 2019 the drought and water resources minister of Australia David Littleproud, said, that he "totally accepts" the link between climate change and drought in Australia because he "live it". He says that the drought in Australia is already eight years long. He called for a reduction in greenhouse gas emission and massive installation of renewable energy. Former leader of the nationalists Barnaby Joyce said that if the drought became more fierce and dams will not be built, the coalition risk "political annihilation".

According to the 2022 IPCC report, there has been an increase in flooding episodes and other catastrophic weather events because of global warming. These unusual weather changes in include rainfall in the north and severe droughts in the south. Less rainfall means less streamflow of water for major cities. The IPCC recommends a step up to our adaptation and finance policies in our systems to keep up with the drastic impacts of climate change for a sustainable development.

Water resources 

Healthy and diverse vegetation is essential to river health and quality, and many of Australia's most important catchments are covered by native forest, maintaining a healthy ecosystem. Climate change will affect growth, species composition and pest incursion of native species and in turn, will profoundly affect water supply from these catchments. Increased re-afforestation in cleared catchments also has the prospect for water losses.

The CSIRO predicts that the additional results in Australia of a temperature rise of between only 1 and 2 degrees Celsius will be:
 12–25% reduction inflow in the Murray River and Darling River basin.
 7–35% reduction in Melbourne's water supply.

Bushfires 

There is an increase in fire activity in Australia in the latest decades. The causes include "more dangerous fire weather conditions, increased risk factors associated with pyroconvection, including fire-generated thunderstorms, and increased ignitions from dry lightning, all associated to varying degrees with anthropogenic climate change".

Firefighting officials are concerned that the effects of climate change will increase the frequency and intensity of bushfires under even a "low global warming" scenario. A 2006 report, prepared by CSIRO Marine and Atmospheric Research, Bushfire CRC, and the Australian Bureau of Meteorology, identified South Eastern Australia as one of the three most fire-prone areas in the world, and concluded that an increase in fire-weather risk is likely at most sites over the next several decades, including the average number of days when the McArthur Forest Fire Danger Index rating is very high or extreme. It also found that the combined frequencies of days with very high and extreme FFDI ratings are likely to increase 4–25% by 2020 and 15–70% by 2050, and that the increase in fire-weather risk is generally largest inland.

Australian Greens leader Bob Brown said that the fires were "a sobering reminder of the need for this nation and the whole world to act and put at a priority the need to tackle climate change". The Black Saturday Royal Commission recommended that "the amount of fuel-reduction burning done on public land each year should be more than doubled".

In 2018, the fire season in Australia began in the winter. August 2018 was hotter and windier than the average. Those meteorological conditions led to a drought in New South Wales. The Government of the state already gave more than $1 billion to help the farmers. The hotter and drier climate led to more fires. The fire seasons in Australia are lengthening and fire events became more frequent in the latest 30 years. These trends are probably linked to climate change.

The 2019–20 Australian bushfire season was by some measures Australia's "worst bushfire season on record". In New South Wales, the fires burnt through more land than any other blazes in the past 25 years, in addition to being the state's worst bushfire season on record. Approximately 3 billion animals were killed or displaced by the bushfires and this made them one of the worst natural disasters in recorded history. The chance of reaching the climatic conditions that fuels the fires became more than four times bigger since the year 1900 and will become eight times more likely to occur if the temperature will rise by 2 degrees from the preindustrial level. In December 2019 the New South Wales Government declared a state of emergency after record-breaking temperatures and prolonged drought exacerbated the bushfires.

In 2019 bushfires linked to climate change created air pollution 11 times higher that the hazardous level in many areas of New South Wales. Many medical groups called to protect people from "public health emergency" and moving on from fossil fuels.

According to the United Nations Environment Programme the megafires in Australia in 2019–2020 are probably linked to climate change that created the unusually dry and hot weather conditions. This is part of a global trend. Brazil, the United States, the Russian Federation, and the Democratic Republic of the Congo all face similar problems. By the second week of January the fires burned a territory of approximately 100,000 square kilometres close to the territory of England, killed one billion animals and caused large economic damage.

Researchers claim that the exceptionally strong wildfires in 2019–2020 were impossible without the effects of climate change. More than one-fifth of Australian forests were burned in one season, which was completely unprecedented. They say that: "In the case of recent events in Australia, there is no doubt that the record temperatures of the past year would not be possible without anthropogenic influence, and that under a scenario where emissions continue to grow, such a year would be average by 2040 and exceptionally cool by 2060." Climate change probably also caused drier weather conditions in Australia by impacting Indian Ocean Dipole, which also increase fires. In average, below 2% of Australian forests burn annually. Climate change has increased the likelihood of the wildfires in 2019–2020 by at least 30%, but researchers said the result is probably conservative.

Extreme weather events

Rainfall patterns and the degree of droughts and storms brought about by extreme weather conditions are likely to be affected. The CSIRO predicts that a temperature rise of between 2 and 3 degrees Celsius on the Australian continent could incur some of the following extreme weather occurrences, in addition to standard patterns:
 Wind speeds of tropical cyclones could intensify by 5 to 10%.
 In 100 years, strong tides would increase by 12–16% along eastern Victoria's coast.
 The forest fire danger indices in New South Wales and Western Australia would grow by 10% and the forest fire danger indices in south, central and north-east Australia would increase by more than 10%.

Heatwaves 
A report in 2014 revealed that, due to the change in climatic patterns, heat waves were found to be increasingly more frequent and severe, with an earlier start to the season and longer duration.

Since temperatures began to be recorded in 1910, they have increased by an average of 1 °C, with most of this change occurring from 1950 onwards. This period has seen the frequency and intensity of extreme heat events increase.

Summer 2013–14 was warmer than average for the entirety of Australia. Both Victoria and South Australia saw record-breaking temperatures. Adelaide recorded a total of 13 days reaching 40 °C or more, 11 of which reached 42 °C or more, as well as its fifth-hottest day on record—45.1 °C on 14 January. The number of days over 40 °C beat the previous record of summer 1897–1898, when 11 days above 40 °C were recorded. Melbourne recorded six days over 40 °C, while nighttime temperatures were much warmer than usual, with some nights failing to drop below 30 °C. Overall, the summer of 2013–2014 was the third-hottest on record for Victoria, fifth-warmest on record for New South Wales, and sixth-warmest on record for South Australia. This heatwave has been directly linked to climate change, which is unusual for specific weather events.

Following the 2014 event, it was predicted that temperatures might increase by up to 1.5 °C by 2030.

2015 was Australia's fifth-hottest year on record, continuing the trend of record-breaking high temperatures across the country. According to Australian Climate Council in 2017 Australia had its warmest winter on record, in terms of average maximum temperatures, reaching nearly 2 °C above average. January 2019 was the hottest month ever in Australia with average temperatures exceeding .

Ecosystems and biodiversity 

Sustained climate change could have drastic effects on the ecosystems of Australia. For example, rising ocean temperatures and continual erosion of the coasts from higher water levels will cause further bleaching of the Great Barrier Reef. Beyond that, Australia's climate will become even harsher, with more powerful tropical cyclones and longer droughts.

The Department of Climate Change said in its Climate Change Impacts and Costs fact sheet: "...ecologically rich sites, such as the Great Barrier Reef, Queensland Wet Tropics, Kakadu Wetlands, Australian Alpine areas, south-western Australia and sub- Antarctic islands are all at risk, with significant loss of biodiversity projected to occur by 2020". It also said: "Very conservatively, 90 Australian animal species have so far been identified at risk from climate change, including mammals, insects, birds, reptiles, fish, and amphibians from all parts of Australia."

Australia has some of the world's most diverse ecosystems and natural habitats, and it may be this variety that makes them the Earth's most fragile and at-risk when exposed to climate change. The Great Barrier Reef is a prime example. Over the past 20 years it has experienced unparalleled rates of bleaching. Additional warming of 1 °C is expected to cause substantial losses of species and of associated coral communities.

The CSIRO predicts that the additional results in Australia of a temperature rise of between 2 and 3 degrees Celsius will be:
 97% of the Great Barrier Reef bleached annually.
 10–40% loss of principal habitat for Victoria and montane tropical vertebrate species.
 92% decrease in butterfly species' primary habitats.
 98% reduction in Bowerbird habitat in Northern Australia.
 80% loss of freshwater wetlands in Kakadu (30 cm sea level rise).

Great Barrier Reef

The Great Barrier Reef could be killed as a result of the rise in water temperature forecast by the IPCC. A UNESCO World Heritage Site, the reef has experienced unprecedented rates of bleaching over the past two decades, and additional warming of only 1 °C is anticipated to cause considerable losses or contractions of species associated with coral communities.

Lord Howe Island
The coral reefs of the World Heritage-listed Lord Howe Island could be killed as a result of the rise in water temperature forecast by the IPCC.
As of April 2019, approximately 5% of the coral is dead.

Impacts on people

Economic impacts 

According to the Climate Commission (now the Climate Council) report in 2013, the extreme heatwaves, flooding and bushfires striking Australia have been intensified by climate change and will get worse in future in terms of their impacts on people, property, communities and the environment. The summer of 2012/2013 included the hottest summer, hottest month and hottest day on record. The cost of the 2009 bushfires in Victoria was estimated at A$4.4bn (£3bn) and the Queensland floods of 2010/2011 cost over A$5bn.

In 2008 the Treasurer and the Minister for Climate Change and Water released a report that concluded the economy will grow with an emissions trading scheme in place.

A report released in October 2009 by the Standing Committee on Climate Change, Water, Environment and the Arts, studying the effects of a 1-metre sea level rise, quite possible within the next 30–60 years, concluded that around 700,000 properties around Australia, including 80,000 buildings, would be inundated, the collective value of these properties is estimated at $155 billion.

In 2019 the Australian Bureau of Agricultural and Resource Economics and Sciences published a report about the impact of climate change on the profitability of the Australian agriculture, saying that the profit of the Australian farms was cut by 22% due to climate change in the years 2000–2019.

According to the 2022 IPCC report Australia will lose billions of dollars due to loss of life, and physical damages. These natural disasters are caused by climate change and increasing global warming will worsen these events. The report estimates that under 2 degrees of warming Australia will lose $115 billion dollars in the next decade, and $350 billion in the next twenty years. If warming goes up to under 3 degrees of warming Australia's economy will lose $200 billion dollars and $600 billion by 2042.

Agriculture forestry and livestock
Small changes caused by global warming, such as a longer growing season, a more temperate climate and increased  concentrations, may benefit Australian crop agriculture and forestry in the short term. However, such benefits are unlikely to be sustained with increasingly severe effects of global warming. Changes in precipitation and consequent water management problems will further exacerbate Australia's current water availability and quality challenges, both for commercial and residential use.

The CSIRO predicts that the additional results in Australia of a temperature rise of between 3 and 4 degrees Celsius will be:
 32% possibility of diminished wheat production (without adaptation).
 45% probability of wheat crop value being beneath present levels (without adaptation).
 55% of primary habitat lost for Eucalyptus.
 25–50% rise in common timber yield in cool and wet parts of South Australia.
 25–50% reduction in common timber yield in North Queensland and the Top End.
 6% decrease in Australian net primary production (for 20% precipitation decrease)
 128% increase in tick-associated losses in net cattle production weight.

Electricity demand 
Use of domestic air conditioners during severe heatwaves can double electricity demand, placing great stress on electricity generation and transmission networks, and lead to load shedding.

Impacts on housing

Settlements and infrastructure
Global warming could lead to substantial alterations in climate extremes, such as tropical cyclones, heat waves and severe precipitation events. This would degrade infrastructure and raise costs through intensified energy demands, maintenance for damaged transportation infrastructure, and disasters, such as coastal flooding. In the coastal zone, sea level rise and storm surge may be more critical drivers of these changes than either temperature or precipitation.

The CSIRO describes the additional impact on settlements and infrastructure for rises in temperature of only 1 to 2 degrees Celsius:
 A 22% rise in 100-year storm surge height around Cairns; as a result, the area flooded doubles.

Human settlements
Climate change will have a higher impact on Australia's coastal communities, due to the concentration of population, commerce and industry. Climate modelling suggests that a temperature rise of 1–2 °C will result in more intense storm winds, including those from tropical cyclones. Combine this with sea level rise, and the result is greater flooding, due to higher levels of storm surge and wind speed. Coleman, T. (2002) The impact of climate change on insurance against catastrophes. Proceedings of Living with Climate Change Conference. Canberra, 19 December.) Tourism of coastal areas may also be affected by coastal inundation and beach erosion, as a result of sea level rise and storm events. At higher levels of warming, coastal impacts become more severe with higher storm winds and sea levels.

Property
A report released in October 2009 by the Standing Committee on Climate Change, Water, Environment and the arts, studying the effects of a 1-metre sea level rise, possible within the next 30–60 years, concluded that around 700,000 properties around Australia, including 80,000 buildings, would be inundated. The collective value of these properties is estimated at $150 billion.

A 1-metre sea level rise would have massive impacts, not just on property and associated economic systems, but in displacement of human populations throughout the continent. Queensland is the state most at risk due to the presence of valuable beachfront housing.

Health impacts 

The CSIRO predicts that the additional results in Australia of a temperature rise of between only 1 and 2 degrees Celsius will be:
 Southward spread of malaria receptive zones.
 Risk of dengue fever among Australians increases from 170,000 people to 0.75–1.6 million.
 10% increase in diarrhoeal diseases among Aboriginal children in central Australia.
 100% increase in a number of people exposed to flooding in Australia.
 Increased influx of refugees from the Pacific Islands.
Based on some predictions for 2070, data suggests that people who are not accustomed to the warmer climate may experience as much as 45 days per year where they are unable to tolerate being outside, compared to the current 4–6 days per year.

Impacts on indigenous Australians 

Indigenous Australians have a millennia long history of responding and adapting to social and environmental changes. Indigenous Australians have a high level of situated traditional knowledge and historical knowledge about climate change. However, the exposure of Indigenous Australians to climate change impacts is exacerbated by existing socio-economic disadvantages which are linked to colonial and post-colonial marginalisation.

Some of these changes include a rise in sea levels, getting hotter and for a longer period of time, and more severe cyclones during the cyclone season.  Climate issues include wild fires, heatwaves, floods, cyclones, rising sea levels, rising temperatures, and erosion. The communities most affected by climate changes are those in the North where Aboriginal and Torres Strait Islander people make up 30% of the population. Aboriginal Australians and Torres Strait Islander communities located in the coastal north are the most disadvantaged due to social and economic issues and their reliance on traditional land for food, culture, and health. This has begged the question for many community members in these regions, should they move away from this area or remain present.

Many Aboriginal people live in rural and remote agricultural areas across Australia, especially in the Northern and Southern areas of the continent. There are a variety of different climate impacts on different Aboriginal communities which includes cyclones in the Northern region and flooding in Central Australia which negatively impacts cultural sites and therefore the relationship between indigenous people and the places that hold their traditional knowledge. Other effects include sea level rise, loss of land and hunting ground, changes in fire regimes, increased severity and duration of wet and dry seasons as well as reduced numbers of animals in the sea, rivers and creeks.

Vulnerability 
The vulnerability comes from remote location where indigenous groups live, lower socio-economic status, and reliance of natural systems for economic needs. Disadvantages which are compounding Indigenous peoples vulnerability to climate change include inadequate health and educational services, limited employment opportunities as well as insufficient infrastructure. Top down institutions have also restricted Indigenous Australians ability to contribute to climate policy frameworks and have their culture and practices recognised.
Many of the economic, political, and social-ecological issues present in indigenous communities are long term effects from colonialism and the continued marginalization of these communities. These issues are aggravated by climate change and environmental changes in their respective regions. Indigenous people are seen as particularly vulnerable to climate change because they already live in poverty, poor housing and have poor educational and health services, other socio-political factors place them at risk for climate change impacts. Indigenous people have been portrayed as victims and as vulnerable populations for many years by the media. Aboriginal Australians believe that they have always been able to adapt to climate changes in their geographic areas.

Many communities have argued for more community input into strategies and ways to adapt to climate issues instead of top down approaches to combating issues surrounding environmental change. This includes self-determination and agency when deciding how to respond to climate change including proactive actions. Indigenous people have also commented on the need to maintain their physical and mental well being in order to adapt to climate change which can be helped through the kinship relationships between community members and the land they occupy.

In Australia, Aboriginal people have argued that in order for the government to combat climate change, their voices must be included in policy making and governance over traditional land. Much of the government and institutional policies related to climate change and environmental issues in Australia has been done so through a top down approach. Indigenous communities have stated that this limits and ignores Aboriginal Australian voices and approaches. Due to traditional knowledge held by these communities and elders within those communities, traditional ecological knowledge and frameworks are necessary to combat these and a variety of different environmental issues.

Heat and drought 

Fires and droughts in Australia, including the Northern regions, occur mostly in savannas because of current environmental changes in the region. The majority of the fire prone areas in the savanna region are owned by Aboriginal Australian communities, the traditional stewards of the land. Aboriginal Australians have traditional landscape management methods including burning and clearing the savanna areas which are the most susceptible to fires. Traditional landscape management declined in the 19th century as Western landscape management took over. Today, traditional landscape management has been revitalized by Aboriginal Australians, including elders. This traditional landscape practices include the use of clearing and burning to get rid of old growth. Though the way in which indigenous communities in this region manage the landscape has been banned, Aboriginal Australian communities who use these traditional methods actually help in reducing greenhouse gas emissions.

Impact of climate change on health 
Increased temperatures, wildfires, and drought are major issues in regard to the health of Aboriginal Australian communities. Heat poses a major risk to elderly members of communities in the North. This includes issues such as heat stroke and heat exhaustion. Many of the rural indigenous communities have faced thermal stress and increased issues surrounding access to water resources and ecological landscapes. This impacts the relationship between Aboriginal Australians and biodiversity, as well as impacts social and cultural aspects of society.

Aboriginal Australians who live in isolated and remote traditional territories are more sensitive than non-indigenous Australians to changes that effect the ecosystems they are a part of. This is in large part due to the connection that exists between their health (including physical and mental), the health of their land, and the continued practice of traditional cultural customs. Aboriginal Australians have a unique and important relationship with the traditional land of their ancestors. Because of this connection, the dangerous consequences of climate change in Australia has resulted in a decline in health including mental health among an already vulnerable population. In order to combat health disparities among these populations, community based projects and culturally relevant mental and physical health programs are necessary and should include community members when running these programs.

Traditional knowledge

Indigenous people have always responded and adapted to climate change, including indigenous people of Australia.  Aboriginal Australian people have existed in Australia for tens of thousands of years. Due to this continual habitation, Aboriginal Australians have observed and adapted to climatic and environmental changes for millennia which uniquely positions them to be able to respond to current climate changes. Though these communities have shifted and changed their practices overtime, traditional ecological knowledge exists that can benefit local and indigenous communities today. This knowledge is part of traditional cultural and spiritual practices within these indigenous communities. The practices are directly tied to the unique relationship between Aboriginal Australians and their ecological landscapes. This relationship results in a socio-ecological system of balance between humans and nature Indigenous communities in Australia have specific generational traditional knowledge about weather patterns, environmental changes and climatic changes. These communities have adapted to climate change in the past and have knowledge that non-Indigenous people may be able to utilize to adapt to climate change currently and in the future.

Indigenous people have not been offered many opportunities or provided with sufficient platforms to influence and contribute their traditional knowledge to the creation of current international and local policies associated to climate change adaptation. Although, Indigenous people have pushed back on this reality, by creating their own platforms and trying to be active members in the conversation surrounding climate change including at international meetings. Specifically, Indigenous people of Australia have traditional knowledge to adapt to increased pressures of global environmental change.

Though some of this traditional knowledge was not utilised and conceivably lost with the introduction of white settlers in the 18th century, recently communities have begun to revitalize these traditional practices. Australian Aboriginal traditional knowledge includes language, cultural, spiritual practices, mythology and land management.

Responses to climate change

Indigenous knowledge has been passed down through the generations with the practice of oral tradition. Given the historical relationship between the land and the people and the larger ecosystem Aboriginal Australians choose to stay and adapt in similar ways to their ancestors before them. Aboriginal Australians have observed short and long term environmental changes and are highly aware of weather and climate changes. Recently, elders have begun to be utilised by indigenous and non-indigenous communities to understand traditional knowledge related to land management.  This includes seasonal knowledge means indigenous knowledge pertaining to weather, seasonal cycles of plants and animals, and land and landscape management. The seasonal knowledge allows indigenous communities to combat environmental changes and may result in healthier social-ecological systems. Much of traditional landscape and land management includes keeping the diversity of flora and fauna as traditional foodways. Ecological calendars is one traditional framework used by Aboriginal Australian communities. These ecological calendars are way for indigenous communities to organize and communicate traditional ecological knowledge. The ecological calendars includes seasonal weather cycles related to biological, cultural, and spiritual ways of life.

Mitigation

Climate change mitigation focuses on steps taken to reduce greenhouse gas emissions. It is the set of preventative measures taken to curb global warming and climate change. Examples would be investing in clean fuel and using renewable energy such as wind and solar power.

According to the CSIRO and Garnaut Climate Change Review, climate change is expected to have numerous adverse effects on many species, regions, activities and much infrastructure and areas of the economy and public health in Australia. The Stern Report and Garnaut Review on balance expect these to outweigh the costs of mitigation.

The World Resources Institute identifies policy uncertainty and over-reliance on international markets as the top threats to Australia's GHG mitigation.

Emissions reductions 

Internationally, Australia pledged as part of Paris Agreement to reduce emissions by 43% by 2030  and achieve net zero emissions by 2050. Domestically, the Clean Energy Act 2011 addresses GHG with an emissions cap, carbon price, and subsidies. Emissions by the electric sector are addressed by Renewable Energy targets at multiple scales, Australian Renewable Energy Agency (ARENA), Clean Energy Finance Corporation (CEFC), carbon capture and storage flagships, and feed-in tariffs on solar panels. Emissions by the industrial sector are addressed by the Energy Efficiency Opportunities (EEO) program. 

Emissions by the building sector are addressed by building codes, minimum energy performance standards, Commercial Building Disclosure program, state energy-saving obligations, and the National Energy Saving Initiative. Emissions by the transportation sector are addressed by reduced fuel tax credits and vehicle emissions performance standards. Emissions by the agricultural sector are addressed by the Carbon Farming Initiative and state land-clearing laws. Emissions by the land use sector are addressed by the Clean Energy Future Package, which consists of the Carbon Farming Futures program, Diversity Fund, Regional Natural Resources Management Planning for Climate Change Fund, Indigenous Carbon Farming Fund, and Carbon Farming Skills program.

Forestry and forest-related options for carbon sinks 
In Australia, forestry and forest-related options are the most significant and most easily achieved carbon sink making up 105 Mt per year CO2-e or about 75 per cent of the total figure attainable for the Australian state of Queensland from 2010 to 2050. Among the forestry options, forestry with the primary aim of carbon storage (called carbon forestry) has the highest attainable carbon storage capacity (77 Mt CO2-e/yr) while strategy balanced with biodiversity plantings can return 7–12 times more native vegetation for a 10%–30% reduction of carbon storage performance. 

Legal strategies to encourage this form of biosequestration include permanent protection of forests in National Parks or on the World Heritage List, properly funded management and bans on use of rainforest timbers and inefficient uses such as woodchipping old growth forest.

Policies and legislation to achieve mitigation

Paris Agreement 
The Paris agreement is a legally international agreement adopted at the COP 21, its main goal is to limit global warming to below 1.5 degrees Celsius, compared to pre-industrial levels. The Nationally Determined Contributions (NDCs) are the plans to fight climate change adapted for each country. Every party in the agreement has different goals based on its own historical climate records and country's circumstances.  All the goals for each country are stated in their NDC.

Australia's target regarding reductions from 2005 year levels:

 26–28% reduction of greenhouse gases (GHG) until 2030 from 2005 levels. In 2022 the new Australian government officially declared the update of the targets to 43% reduction by 2030 and net zero emissions by 2050.
 Gases covered in reductions: Carbon dioxide, Methane, Nitrous oxide, Hydrofluorocarbon (HFCs), Perfluorinated compound (PFCs), Sulfur hexafluoride (SF6) and Nitrogen trifluoride (NF3).
Countries have different ways to achieve the established goals depending on resources. Australia's developed approach to support the NDC climate change plan is the following:

 Enabling new technologies with low emissions and promoting economic growth.
 Establish regional hydrogen exports to strengthen the country's industry and fund research in the field and enable distribution.
 Improve charging and refueling infrastructure to enable companies and fleets to integrate new more sustainable vehicle technology.
 The country has created a development fund whose purpose is for projects concerning carbon dioxide capture. The fund is for storage, use and carbon capture.
 Investments in technological development that reduces emissions in the sectors of agriculture, industry, transport and manufacturing.
 Climate solution package to increase investment in projects to generate clean energy. The package also includes extra funds to support development in the hard-to-reach sectors.
 Australia has a legalised obligation for the major emitting sectors in the country where the emissions are to be kept below their baseline.

Australia has through funds such as Australia emission reduction fund contributed with 60 million tonnes reduction of greenhouse gases. The fund enables businesses to earn carbon credits. This is done by storing or preventing emissions through new sustainable techniques.

Adaptation 

According to the IPCC's 2001 Assessment Report, no matter how much effort is put into mitigating climate change, some amount of climate change cannot be avoided. The report shared that climate change adaptation should complement mitigation efforts. Adaptation is the approach that focuses on alleviating current problems brought about by global warming and climate change. It is the attempt to live with the changes in the environment and the economy that global warming has generated and will continue to generate. In short, it involves taking action to deal with the problems brought about by global warming and climate change. Examples include building better flood defences and avoiding the building of residential areas near low-lying, flood-prone areas. In cities with a proven vulnerability to climate change, investment is likely to require the strengthening of urban infrastructure, including storm drain systems, water supply and treatment plants, and protection or relocation of solid waste management and power generation facilities.

Coastal regions are likely to need large investment in physical infrastructure projects, specifically projects related to the effects of rising sea levels. Projects such as the construction of protective barriers against rising sea levels, the building of dams to retain and manage water, the redesign and development of port facilities and the improvement of the defence systems at coastal areas should be carried out.
Federal, state and territory policy makers have supported a National Biodiversity and Climate Change Action Plan that works to adapt to the impacts of climatic change and manage the effects on wildlife.

National government programs

Regional natural resource management (NRM) organisations 
Federal natural resource goals, government agencies and non-government organizations established 56 regional natural resource management (NRM) organisations beginning in the mid-1990s. NRM organisations fall under the federal government Natural Heritage Trust. NRM operate according to individual constitutions, usually by the state government and others by community associations. Their boards are appointed by either the local government or community stakeholders. NRM Planning for Climate Fund, put $13.6 million toward helping NRMs plan land use in light of climate change by building a base of detailed climatic information.

National Climate Change Adaptation Programme 
The Minister for Energy and Emissions Reduction has come up with the National Climate Change Adaptation Programme which aims to work with industries, scientific organisations, residents and other governments to create workable solutions. Some A$14 million over a period of four years (2008–2012) is to be spent on this initiative. The programme has forged strong research links in at-risk areas such as the Great Barrier Reef. Research conducted in the Great Barrier Reef is focused on developing methods to deal with climate change to protect the reef. It is hoped that this work will create a universal model for sustainable, cost-effective reef development. According to the programme's brochure: "National greenhouse mitigation policies and programmes are projected to reduce emissions by 94 million tonnes by 2010 – the equivalent of removing every motor vehicle in Australia from the road! However, the greenhouse gases already in the atmosphere and the growing emissions from around the world will affect our climate. Adaptation to climate change will complement action to reduce greenhouse gases".

Climate Adaptation Flagship 
The Australian Commonwealth Scientific and Industrial Research Organisation (CSIRO) started the Climate Adaptation Flagship. Its aim is "enabling Australia to adapt more effectively to the impacts of climate change and variability and informing national planning, regulation and investment decisions". This is part of the National Research Flagships Program. It is designed to bring various stakeholders, i.e. research companies, industries, international connections, eminent scientists and CSIRO, together in hope of delivering practical solutions that address the pressing issues of Australia.

The Climate Adaptation Flagship project concerns both climate variability (or non-human causes, as defined by the United Nations Framework Convention on Climate Change) and climate change. The research budget for this Flagship for the year 2008–09 is close to A$30 million. There are four research prongs to this project: Pathways to adaptation; Sustainable cities and costs; Managing species and natural ecosystems; Adaptive primary industries, enterprises and communities.

National Climate Change Adaptation Research Facility 
The National Climate Change Adaptation Research Facility (NCCARF) is hosted by Griffith University in Queensland and "leads the research community in a national interdisciplinary effort to generate the information needed by decision-makers in government and in vulnerable sectors and communities to manage the risks of climate change impacts."

The key roles of NCCARF include:
 developing National Adaptation Research Plans to identify critical gaps in the information available to decision-makers
 synthesising existing and emerging national and international research on climate change impacts and adaptation and developing targeted communication products
 undertaking a program of Integrative Research to address national priorities, and
 establishing and maintaining Adaptation Research Networks to link together key researchers and assist them in focusing on national research priorities.

The facility is a partnership between the Australian government's Department of Climate Change and Griffith University, with a consortium of funding partners and universities drawn from across the country.

The Local Adaptations Pathway Program 
The Australian government is of the view that local government is critical in managing the impacts of climate change and seeks to assist local councils in studying and applying adaptation options. The programme is the Australian government's initiative to enable councils to go through climate change risk assessments and come up with action plans to prepare for the impacts the phenomenon may have on local society. Up to A$50,000 will be released. A list of councils successful in procuring the funding is provided on the programme's website.

Policies and legislation 

In November 1981, the Office of National Assessments (intelligence agency) presented prime minister Malcolm Fraser with a classified-confidential assessment noting scientific acceptance of the greenhouse effect and resultant "measurably warmer" temperatures and "related climatic changes", and also projecting effects of possible doubling and quadrupling of atmospheric  levels by the middle and end of the 21st century. The assessment focused on the implications for the country's fossil fuel industry.

In the late 1980s and early 1990s, there was clear Australian consensus about the need for action on climate change between the two major political parties. However, following the 1991 recession, incoming right wing governments began framing science of climate change as a continuing debate. In 1997, Australia joined the United States as the only countries to not ratify the Kyoto Protocol.

With voters influenced by events like the Millennium drought and 2006 film An Inconvenient Truth, both parties went to the 2007 election promising action on climate change, with the then opposition calling climate change the "greatest moral, economic and social challenge of our time". The incumbent Howard government lost, and the incoming Labor government immediately ratified the Kyoto Protocol. In 2009, before a bill could be passed, with the support of opposition leader Malcolm Turnbull, the opposition changed leaders to Tony Abbott, and supported by The Greens but for the opposite reason that Rudd's scheme was too weak and potentially locked in failure, blocked Rudd's Carbon Pollution Reduction Scheme.

In 2010, the Rudd government decided to delay the implementation of the Carbon Pollution Reduction Scheme (CPRS) until the end of the first commitment period of the Kyoto Protocol (ending in 2012). They cited the lack of bipartisan support for the CPRS and slow international progress on climate action as the reasons for the decision. In turn, the delay was strongly criticised by the Federal Opposition as well as community and grassroots action groups such as GetUp.

Following the unsuccessful Copenhagen Summit, the Rudd was replaced by Gillard as Prime Minister, who stated that "there will be no 'carbon tax' under the government I lead".

The Gillard Labor government established several government entities to manage Australia's response to climate change:

 The Climate Change Authority, an independent statutory body that provides advice and performs research for the federal government on climate change.
 The Clean Energy Regulator, an independent statutory body that administers federal government schemes to measure and reduce Australia's greenhouse gas emissions.
 The Australian Renewable Energy Agency (ARENA), a corporate body that manages renewable energy programs. 
 The Clean Energy Finance Corporation (CEFC), a government-owned corporation that invests in clean energy technologies.

In 2011, Parliament passed the Clean Energy Act 2011, which introduced carbon pricing in Australia, colloquially known as a 'carbon tax'. It required large businesses, defined as those emitting over 25,000 tons of carbon dioxide equivalent annually, to purchase emissions permits. The strong backlash lead by opposition leader Abbott led to her being replaced as leader by Rudd, then Abbott at the next election. Under his leadership, Australia became the first country to repeal a carbon pricing program.

In 2015, Abbott was replaced as Prime Minister by Minister for Communications Malcolm Turnbull under the condition that his climate policy would not change. Australia attended the 2015 United Nations Climate Change Conference and adopted the Paris Agreement. In limiting further action on climate change, Australia joined Russia, Turkey and Brazil in citing US President Trump's promise to withdraw from the Paris Agreement.

In 2018, Turnbull was replaced by Scott Morrison as leader of the Liberal Party and Prime Minister. Morrison won the 2019 election with an unchanged climate policy.

In June 2021, the Sustainable Development Report 2021 scored Australia last out of 193 United Nations member countries for action taken to reduce global greenhouse gas emissions, scoring 10 out of 100 in an assessment of fossil fuel emissions, emissions associated with imports and exports, and policies for pricing carbon.

In May 2022, the Coalition lost the federal election to the Labor Party, led by Anthony Albanese. In a machinery of government change, a new Department of Climate Change, Energy, the Environment and Water will be established. The new government committed to a 43% reduction in Australia's emissions by 2030 (compared to 2005 levels), and net zero emissions by 2050.

International cooperation 

Internationally, Australia contributed to the creation of the Asia Pacific Rain Forest Partnership, International Coral Reef Initiative, International Partnership for Blue Carbon, Mission Innovation, Clean Energy Ministerial Forum, International Solar Alliance, and the Kigali Amendment to the Montreal Protocol. The government has also provided $1 billion to assist developing countries in reducing GHG emissions, partly through the United Nations Framework Convention on Climate Change Green Climate Fund. Australia's scientists also provide data on climate, emissions, impacts, and mitigation options for the Intergovernmental Panel on Climate Change assessments.

Under the Paris Agreement, Australia has committed to reducing emission by 26-28% below 2005 levels. This would mean reducing emissions by half per capita and by two-thirds across the economy. The Department of Environment and Energy noted in a 2017 review that no one policy could achieve what multiple, sector-specific ones have. This approach has manifested in Australia meeting its first Kyoto Protocol target. Australia is now bound to reducing emissions to at least 5% by 2020 under the Copenhagen Accord and Cancun Agreements and 0.5% less than 1990 levels by 2020 under their second target for the Kyoto Protocol.

While Australia opposed a 1.5 °C target at the 2015 negotiations for the Paris Agreement, in 2019, they supported the Kainaki II Declaration of the Pacific Islands Forum, which included this target. In 2022, Australia discussed hosting COP29 with its Pacific island neighbours in 2024 at the Pacific Islands Forum.

Society and culture

Politics 

Despite the support of a clear scientific consensus, climate change has been a divisive or controversial issue in Australian politics since the 2000s. It has sometimes been referred to as a "culture war" in the country. Conservatives have generally opposed climate mitigation policies and renewable energy, instead favouring or supporting the country's coal and fossil fuels industries, which make up a large part of the economy. Proposed carbon pricing during the premiership of Julia Gillard proved highly divisive, and was later repealed under Tony Abbott. Climate change was a key issue in the 2022 federal election, where the Australian Labor Party and teal independents made gains in part due to promoting environmental policies.

Activism 

Climate change protests have taken place in Australia during the 21st century.In 2005, with support from Uniting Church and Catholic Earthcare, the Australian Conservation Foundation and the National Council of Churches Australia produced a brochure, Changing Climate, Changing Creation, which was distributed to churches across the country to call for action on climate change. 

Rising Tide held environmental direct action protests in February 2007, where more than 100 small and medium-sized craft, including swimmers and people on surfboards, gathered in Newcastle harbour. Young people from the Real Action On Climate Change shut down two coal-fired power stations in September 2007. A 2009 "Walk Against Warming" drew 40,000 participants in Melbourne.

The Say Yes demonstrations took place on 5 June 2011, in which 45,000 people demonstrated in every major city nationwide in support of carbon pricing policies. Thousands of Australian children took part in school strikes for climate in 2018 and 2019. The September 2019 climate strikes attracted an estimated 180,000 to 300,000 participants across eight Australian capital cities and 140 urban centres, making it one of the largest protests in the country's history and one of the largest climate protests globally. Approximately 2,500 businesses also took part.

The response to the 2019–20 Australian bushfire season sparked protests in Sydney, Canberra, Melbourne, Victoria, Brisbane, Hobart, and outside the Australian High Commission in London. Prime Minister Scott Morrison was criticized for climate denial in the wake of the bushfires. Extinction Rebellion held rallies in London, Berlin, Madrid, Copenhagen and Stockholm calling for stronger climate action. Direct action group Blockade Australia began disruptive activism in 2021 and 2022.

Litigation 

Groups including Rising Tide and Queensland Conservation have initiated legal challenges to coal mines under the Commonwealth EPBC legislation. In late 2006, Queensland Conservation lodged an objection to the greenhouse gas emissions from a large coal mine expansion proposed by Xstrata Coal Queensland Pty Ltd. QC's action aimed to have the true costs of the greenhouse gas emissions from coal mining recognised. The Newlands Coal Mine Expansion will produce 28.5 million tonnes of coal over its fifteen years of operation. The mining, transport and use of this coal will emit 84 million tonnes of  into the atmosphere. Queensland Conservation aims to have reasonable and practical measures imposed on new mines to avoid, reduce or offset the emissions from the mining, transport and use of their coal. The Land and Resources Tribunal ruled against the case.

Media coverage

Projected impacts by location 

The impacts of climate change will vary significantly across Australia. The Australian Government appointed Climate Commission have prepared summary reports on the likely impacts of climate change for regions across Australia, including: Queensland, NSW, Victoria and Tasmania.

Capital cities

Adelaide
Adelaide will get hotter and drier with rainfall predicted to decline 8% to 29% by 2090 and average temperature to increase between 4 and 0.9 degrees. The number of days above 35 degrees will increase by 50% in 2090 and the number of days above 40 degrees will double. Bringing it close to Northampton, Western Australia, for temperature and Kadina, South Australia, for rainfall.

Sea levels will rise with predictions between 39 to 61 cm by 2090. And extreme seas are predicted to rise as well, with the CSIRO predicting buildings in Port Adelaide would need to be raised by 50 to 81 cm to keep the amount of flooding incidents the same as recorded between 1986 and 2005.

Brisbane 
In a RCP 4.5 scenario Brisbane's temperature will be similar to that of Rockhampton today while rainfall will be closest to Gympie. The CSIRO predicts rainfall in Brisbane will fall between -23% (235 mm) and -4% (45.3 mm) annually by 2090 while temperature will rise between 4.2° and 0.9°. The number of hot days and hot nights will double by 2050, with many people needing to avoid outdoor activity in summer. Further urban growth increases the number of hot nights even further. Hot nights increase deaths amongst the elderly. Rainfall will be deposited in less frequent more intense rain events, fire days will also get more frequent while frost days will decrease. Sea levels are predicted to rise by 80 cm by 2100 and there will be more frequent sea level extremes.

Darwin 
In a RCP 4.5 scenario Darwin's temperature will be similar to that of Daly River now, with its rainfall most like that of Milikapiti. In a RCP 8.5 scenario, indicating higher greenhouse gas emissions, Darwin's temperature loses any close comparison in Australia being significantly hotter than every town in Australia is today (with the exclusion of Halls Creek in Autumn).

Sydney
Suburbs of Sydney like Manly, Botany, Narrabeen, Port Botany, and Rockdale, which lie on rivers like the Parramatta, face risks of flooding in low-lying areas such as parks (like Timbrell Park and Majors Bay Reserve), or massive expenses in rebuilding seawalls to higher levels. Sea levels are predicted to rise between 38 and 66 cm by 2090.

Temperature in Sydney will increase between 0.9° and 4.2°, while rainfall will decrease between -23% and -4% by 2090. Bringing Sydney's climate close to that of Beaudesert today (under a RCP 8.5 scenario). Different parts of Sydney will warm differently with the greatest impact expected in Western Sydney and Hawkesbury, these areas can expect 5 to 10 additional hot days by 2030. Similarly future rainfall patterns will be different to those today, with more rain expected to fall in summer and autumn and less expected in Winter and Spring. Fire danger days will increase in number by 2070.

Melbourne

Sea levels are projected to rise between 0.37 cm and 0.59 cm at Williamstown (the closest covered point) by 2090. At the higher end of this scale areas in and around Melbourne would be impacted. With some of the most vulnerable areas being the Docklands development and several marinas and berths in Port Phillip. Melbourne's climate will become similar in terms of total rainfall and average temperature to that of Dubbo today, with temperatures warming between 0.9° and 3.8° and total annual rainfall falling between -10% and -4% by 2090. Rainfall patterns will also change with 20% less rainfall predicted during spring in 2050, which may impact the severity of summer bushfires.

The increases in temperature and decrease in rainfall will have a series of follow on effects on the city, including a possible 35% reduction in trees in Melbourne by 2040. And more frequent ambulance callouts and more deaths due to heatwaves. Climate change will cost Melbourne City $12.6bn by 2050.

Perth

In 2090 Perth is predicted to have the rainfall of Yanchep today and the temperature of Geraldton using the RCP 4.5 scenario. Rainfall is predicted to fall between -29% (-226 mm) and -8% (-66 mm) and temperature predicted to rise between 0.9° and 4°. Perth may see the number of days above 35° increase from 28 per year on average to 36 in 2030, and to between 40 and 63 in 2090. While frost days will decrease. Rainfall will increase in intensity while decreasing on average. Drought days in the south west as a whole may increase by as much as 80% versus 20% for Australia. The danger from fire will increase with more fire days for all of Western Australia.

Hobart
By 2090 Hobart's climate will warm between 3.8° and 0.9°, rainfall will decline between 4% and 10%. The temperature pattern will be similar to Port Lincoln while rainfall will be closer to Condoblin's today in a RCP 8.5 scenario. Warm spells are likely to last longer and rainfall will trend to more intense rain events dumping less rain annually, increasing the risk of erosion and flooding. Flooding on the Derwent river will become more regular and extreme with a current 1-in-100-year event being possibly a 2-to-6-year event in 2090. Hobart's fire season will get longer.

Historical aspects

Pre-instrumental climate change 

Paleoclimatic records indicate that during glacial maxima Australia was extremely arid, with plant pollen fossils showing deserts as far as northern Tasmania and a vast area of less than 12% vegetation cover over all of South Australia and adjacent regions of other states. Forest cover was largely limited to sheltered areas of the east coast and the extreme southwest of Western Australia.

During these glacial maxima the climate was also much colder and windier than today. Minimum temperatures in winter in the centre of the continent were as much as 9 °C (16.9F°) lower than they are today. Hydrological evidence for dryness during glacial maxima can also be seen at major lakes in Victoria's Western District, which dried up between around 20,000 and 15,000 years ago and re-filled from around 12,000 years ago.

During the early Holocene, there is evidence from Lake Frome in South Australia and Lake Woods near Tennant Creek that the climate between 8,000 and 9,500 years ago and again from 7,000 to 4,200 years ago was considerably wetter than over the period of instrumental recording since about 1885. The research that gave these records also suggested that the rainfall flooding Frome was certainly summer-dominant rainfall because of pollen counts from grass species. Other sources suggest that the Southern Oscillation may have been weaker during the early Holocene and rainfall over northern Australia less variable as well as higher. The onset of modern conditions with periodic wet season failure is dated at around 4,000 years before the present.

In southern Victoria, there is evidence for generally wet conditions except for a much drier spell between about 3,000 and 2,100 years before the present, when it is believed Lake Corangamite fell to levels well below those observed between European settlement and the 1990s. After this dry period, Western District lakes returned to their previous levels fairly quickly and by 1800 they were at their highest levels in the forty thousand years of record available.

Elsewhere, data for most of the Holocene are deficient, largely because methods used elsewhere to determine past climates (like tree-ring data) cannot be used in Australia owing to the character of its soils and climate. Recently, however, coral cores have been used to examine rainfall over those areas of Queensland draining into the Great Barrier Reef. The results do not provide conclusive evidence of man-made climate change, but do suggest the following:
 There has been a marked increase in the frequency of very wet years in Queensland since the end of the Little Ice Age, a theory supported by there being no evidence for any large Lake Eyre filling during the LIA.
 The dry era of the 1920s and 1930s may well have been the driest period in Australia over the past four centuries.

A similar study, not yet published, is planned for coral reefs in Western Australia.

Records exist of floods in a number of rivers, such as the Hawkesbury, from the time of first settlement. These suggest that, for the period beginning with the first European settlement, the first thirty-five years or so were wet and were followed by a much drier period up to the mid-1860s, when usable instrumental records started.

Development of an instrumental network for climate records 
Although rain gauges were installed privately by some of the earliest settlers, the first instrumental climate records in Australia were not compiled until 1840 at Port Macquarie. Rain gauges were gradually installed at other major centres across the continent, with the present gauges in Melbourne and Sydney dating from 1858 and 1859, respectively.

In eastern Australia, where the continent's first large-scale agriculture began, a large number of rain gauges were installed during the 1860s and by 1875 a comprehensive network had been developed in the "settled" areas of that state. With the spread of the pastoral industry to the north of the continent during this period, rain gauges were established extensively in newly settled areas, reaching Darwin by 1869, Alice Springs by 1874, and the Kimberley, Channel Country and Gulf Savannah by 1880.

By 1885, most of Australia had a network of rainfall reporting stations adequate to give a good picture of climatic variability over the continent. The exceptions were remote areas of western Tasmania, the extreme southwest of Western Australia, Cape York Peninsula, the northern Kimberley and the deserts of northwestern South Australia and southeastern Western Australia. In these areas good-quality climatic data were not available for quite some time after that.

Temperature measurements, although made at major population centres from days of the earliest rain gauges, were generally not established when rain gauges spread to more remote locations during the 1870s and 1880s. Although they gradually caught up in number with rain gauges, many places which have had rainfall data for over 125 years have only a few decades of temperature records.

See also 

Carbon capture and storage in Australia
 Climate change on agriculture
 Climate Institute of Australia
 Climate of Australia
 Environmental issues in Australia
 Living in the Hothouse: How Global Warming Affects Australia, a 2005 book by Ian Lowe
 El Niño–Southern Oscillation
 Effects of the El Niño–Southern Oscillation in Australia
New South Wales Greenhouse Gas Abatement Scheme
Plug-in electric vehicles in Australia
Solar Cities in Australia
Sustainable Development Goals and Australia
 Water restrictions in Australia

References

External links
 Climate Action Network Australia – the Australian branch of a worldwide network of NGOs
 Range Extension Database and Mapping Project, Australia – ecological monitoring project in the marine environment
 National Climate Change Adaptation Programme brochure
 Climate Change projections

 
Australia
Climate of Australia
Environmental issues in Australia
Australia